Mison is a commune in the Alpes-de-Haute-Provence department in southeastern France.

At the top of the hill in the village are the remains of a 13th-century castle built by the Mérvouillon family. The building is organised around a central courtyard and the four main buildings are flanked by square towers. There are two gates. The castle was abandoned by the end of the 18th century. Restorations have been undertaken since 2005.

Population

See also
Communes of the Alpes-de-Haute-Provence department

References

Communes of Alpes-de-Haute-Provence
Alpes-de-Haute-Provence communes articles needing translation from French Wikipedia